KF Çair is a football club based in Çair Municipality, Skopje, North Macedonia. They are currently competing in the OFS Skopje league. Their home ground is Çair Stadium which has a seating capacity of 2,800.

References

External links 
Club info at MacedonianFootball 

Cair
Cair